Imperial Constitution can refer to: 

 Germany's Paulskirchenverfassung
 Japan's Meiji Constitution